Baspa is a genus of butterflies in the family Lycaenidae. The type species is Papilio melampus Stoll. It is part of Rapala.

 
Lycaeninae
Lycaenidae genera